Rangamati is a constituency of the Jatiya Sangsad (National Parliament) of Bangladesh, represented, since 2018 June, by Dipankar Talukdar of the Awami League.

Boundaries 
The constituency consists of the entirety of the Rangamati Hill District.

Members of Parliament 

 Note:Ushatan Talukder contested as Independent politician in 2014
 Note:Chaithoai Roaza contested as Independent politician in 1973

Electoral results

References 

Rangamati Hill District
Parliamentary constituencies in Bangladesh